East Bengal Football Club is an Indian association football club based in Kolkata, West Bengal, which competes in the top tier of Indian football. The club was formed when the vice-president of Jorabagan, Suresh Chandra Chaudhuri, resigned when Jorabagan sent out their starting eleven but with the notable exclusion of defender Sailesh Bose who was dropped from the squad for reasons not disclosed when they were about to face Mohun Bagan in the Coochbehar Cup Semi-Final on 28 July 1920. He along with Raja Manmatha Nath Chaudhuri, Ramesh Chandra Sen, and Aurobinda Ghosh, formed East Bengal, in Jorabagan home of Suresh Chandra on 1 August 1920; 99 years ago. East Bengal started playing in the Calcutta Football League 2nd division from 1921 and in 1925 they qualified for the first division for the first time and since then they have won numerous titles in Indian Football.

East Bengal joined the National Football League since its inception in 1996 and is the only club to play all seasons till date, even after its name change to I-League in 2007. East Bengal have won the National Football League thrice: 2000–01, 2002–03 and 2003–04 and became runners up 7 times, the most number of times by any Indian football club. Among other trophies, East Bengal have won the Calcutta Football League 39 times, IFA Shield 28 times, Federation Cup 8 times and the Durand Cup 16 times.

Apart from domestic success, East Bengal club has been extremely successful among Indian football clubs in the international arena, having won four trophies on foreign soil including the famous ASEAN Club Championship in 2003.

Major appearances

Participation record

Statistics

Overall Record in Continental Competitions

Top scorers

Hat tricks

4 Scored 4 Goals
6 Scored 6 Goals

Asian Club Championship

The AFC Champions League is an annual continental club football competition organised by the Asian Football Confederation. Introduced in 1967 as the Asian Club Championship, the competition rebranded and took on its current name in 2002 as a result of the merger between the Asian Club Championship, the Asian Cup Winners' Cup and the Asian Super Cup. East Bengal took part in the competition twice (1985–86 and 1998–99), failing to go past the group stage/first round both times.

1985–86 Asian Club Championship

1985 Coca-Cola Cup

 and  champions withdrew.

East Bengal qualified for the 1985–86 Asian Club Championship after winning the 1985 Federation Cup. The Red and Gold brigade became the first Indian "club" to qualify for the Asian Club Championship. The format of the tournament was different with different zonal tournaments that were held and the winners of these zonal tournaments would progress into the main finals to be held in Jedah, Saudi Arabia. East Bengal was part of the Central Asia Zone, and the tournament was named Coca-Cola Cup. They were to face the champions of Sri Lanka, Bangladesh, Nepal, Pakistan, Afghanistan, Iran and Maldives however, the two teams from Iran and Afghanistan withdrew their names. The team traveled to Colombo, Sri Lanka where the tournament was hosted and in the first game defeated the champions of Nepal, New Road Team by 7–0 to start their campaign, with forward Biswajit Bhattacharya scoring four goals in the game. In the second match against the favourites Abahani Krira Chakra from Bangladesh, East Bengal managed a 1–0 victory courtesy of a solitary strike from forward Debasish Roy. The next three games, East Bengal won with ease, including a 9–0 victory over Maldivian champions Club Valencia, with Debasish Roy scoring a hattrick, and thus recording the biggest margin of victory by an Indian team over any foreign opponents till date. East Bengal became the champion of the tournament winning all the games, without conceding a single goal. Defender Tarun Dey was awarded the Man of the Tournament award while forward Debasish Roy ended as the second top scorer with 7 goals.

Matches

1985–86 Asian Club Championship
East Bengal qualified for the main round of the 1985–86 Asian Club Championship by winning the Coca-Cola Cup in Sri Lanka and was allotted into the Group A, along with Al-Ahli of Saudi Arabia and Krama Yudha Tiga Berlian of Indonesia. Assistant coach Shyam Thapa took charge of the team after P. K. Banerjee had resigned from his position after the Coca-Cola Cup victory as he took over the India national team. In the opening match, on 19 January 1986, East Bengal faced the Saudi and West Asia champions Al-Ahli and even managed to score first with Debasish Roy scoring in the 33rd minute but the Saudi team came back strong with two goals from Khaled Abu Rass as they lost 2–1. In the second game on 21 January 1986, East Bengal faced another defeat against Indonesian and ASEAN champions Krama Yudha Tiga Berlian as they went down 2–0 and were eliminated from the tournament.

Group stage

East Bengal FC was drawn in Group A along with Al-Ahli of Saudi Arabia and Krama Yudha Tiga Berlian of Indonesia.

Matches

1998–99 Asian Club Championship

East Bengal took part in the 1998–99 Asian Club Championship after finishing runners-up of the 1997–98 National Football League and was drawn against Chinese giants Dalian Wanda FC in the first round. On 19 September 1998, East Bengal travelled to Dalian, China for the first leg of the tie and suffered a 6–0 loss, their heaviest defeat in continental competitions to this date. China national team forward Wang Tao scored a hat-trick for the Chinese side. In the return leg on 3 October 1998, East Bengal managed to hold on to a 0–0 draw at the Kanchenjunga Stadium in Siliguri and were eliminated from the competition.

Matches

Asian Cup Winners' Cup

The Asian Cup Winners' Cup was a football competition run by the Asian Football Confederation. The competition was started in 1991 as a tournament for all the domestic cup winners from countries affiliated to the AFC. In India, the winners of the Durand Cup used to participate in the tournament. East Bengal took part in the Asian Cup Winners' Cup five times, reaching the quarter-finals in their maiden appearance in 1991–92.

1991–92 Asian Cup Winners' Cup 

East Bengal qualified for the 1991–92 Asian Cup Winners' Cup by winning the 1991 Durand Cup. The 1991 season also saw East Bengal, under the coaching of Syed Nayeemuddin, win the Calcutta Football League without even conceding a single goal throughout the tournament. East Bengal was drawn against Abhani Krira Chakra of Bangladesh in the first round of the tournament. In the first-leg, away at the Bangabandhu Stadium, East Bengal drew goalless against a resolute Abahani side. In the return leg at the Salt Lake Stadium, East Bengal managed to grab a 1–0 victory with Bikash Panji scoring the solitary winner for the Red and Gold brigade as they reached the Quarter-finals where they faced Nissan FC of Japan, who would eventually go on to become the Champions of the tournament. In the first-leg, playing home at the Salt Lake Stadium, East Bengal was beaten 1–3 by the 1991 Emperor's Cup champions and in the return leg, East Bengal lost 4–0 and was eliminated from the tournament.

Matches

1993–94 Asian Cup Winners' Cup 

East Bengal qualified for the 1993–94 Asian Cup Winners' Cup by winning the 1993 Durand Cup. East Bengal was drawn with Al-Zawra of Iraq, the 1992–93 Iraq FA Cup champions in the first round of the tournament. Due to the ongoing war situation in Iraq, both the legs were held in India, the first leg at the Salt Lake Stadium while the second leg was held at the Kanchenjunga Stadium in Siliguri, which was a home game for the Iraq side. In the first leg, East Bengal shocked the Iraqi champions and defeated them 6–2 with Carlton Chapman scoring a hat-trick and Sisir Ghosh, Aqueel Ansari and Kumaresh Bhawal scoring one each for East Bengal. Mudhir Khalef Muhsim and Sahib Abbas Hassan scored two for the Iraqi champions. In the return leg, however, Al-Zawra came back strong with a 2–0 win at Siliguri with goals from Sahib Abbas Hassan and Ziad Tariq Aziz, but East Bengal progressed into the second round with a 6–4 aggregate score. In the second round, East Bengal faced South China of Hong Kong. East Bengal lost the first leg at home 1–0 and suffered a 4–1 defeat away in Hong Kong as they were eliminated from the tournament.

Matches

1994–95 Asian Cup Winners' Cup

East Bengal qualified for the 1994–95 Asian Cup Winners' Cup after being runner-up of the 1994 Durand Cup, as Mohun Bagan who were the champions, also won the Federation Cup and qualified for the 1994–95 Asian Club Championship. In the preliminary round for the East Asia zone held in Colombo Sri Lanka, East Bengal was drawn with Renown of Sri Lanka and Club Lagoons of Maldives. East Bengal won 4–0 in the opening game against Club Lagoons but lost 2–1 against the hosts Renown in their second match to finish second in the group. East Bengal qualified for the main tournament as the group runners and faced TOT of Thailand. In the first leg game away in Bangkok, East Bengal lost 4–1 to the 1993 Thai FA Cup champions. In the return leg, however, East Bengal withdrew from the tournament as the match was not held due to a plague scare in Kolkata and no dates could be confirmed. Telecom Club advanced to the quarterfinal on the basis of their first-leg triumph.

Preliminary round (East Asia)
East Bengal was drawn with Renown SC of Sri Lanka and Club Lagoons of Maldives in the preliminary round of the tournament.

Matches

1995 Asian Cup Winners' Cup

East Bengal qualified for the 1995 Asian Cup Winners' Cup by winning the 1995 Durand Cup. In the first round, East Bengal received a bye and progressed into the second round of the tournament where they were drawn against New Radiant of Maldives. In the first leg, away at Malé, East Bengal suffered a 3–0 defeat which became too big of a margin to overcome in the second leg, even after winning 2–0 at home, as they were eliminated from the tournament with a 2–3 aggregate score in favour of New Radiant. Biswanath Mondal and Bhaichung Bhutia had scored in the home win for East Bengal.

Matches

1997–98 Asian Cup Winners' Cup

East Bengal qualified for the 1997–98 Asian Cup Winners' Cup after winning the 1996 Indian Federation Cup. Churchill Brothers were supposed to get the slot for being the runners-up of the 1996–97 National Football League but since JCT, the champions, did not participate in the 1997–98 Asian Club Championship, Churchill Brothers got the spot and East Bengal qualified for the Asian Cup Winners' Cup. In the first round, East Bengal was drawn against Tribhuvan Club of Nepal and in the first leg at home, East Bengal recorded an 8–0 win over the side from Nepal, their second biggest win in continental football. In the away game, East Bengal snatched up a 3–0 victory as they progressed into the second round with an 11–0 aggregate score. In the second round, East Bengal faced the 1996 Emperor's Cup champions Verdy Kawasaki of Japan. In the first leg, away at Naraha, Fukushima, East Bengal suffered a 5–2 defeat against the J League side, however, in the return leg, at Kolkata, East Bengal surprised the Japanese team with a famous 1–0 win courtesy of a solitary strike from Kenyan defender Sammy Omollo. Naushad Moosa also missed a penalty for East Bengal and they were eliminated with a 5–3 aggregate score for Verdy Kawasaki.

Matches

AFC Cup

The AFC Cup is an annual continental club football competition organised by the Asian Football Confederation, started in 2004. The competition is played primarily between clubs from nations that did not receive direct qualifying slots in the top-tier AFC Champions League, based on the AFC Club Competitions Ranking. In India, the winners of the Federation Cup and the I-League received direct entries into the tournament. Since the Federation Cup was abolished in 2017, the slot was given to the play-off winners of the Indian Super League. East Bengal has participated eight times in the tournament, reaching the knockout stages twice including a semi-final appearance in 2013.

2004 AFC Cup

East Bengal qualified for the 2004 AFC Cup after winning the 2002–03 National Football League and was placed in Group E alongside Geylang United of Singapore, Negeri Sembilan of Malaysia and Island of Maldives. East Bengal began their campaign on a terrific note as they won all of their first four matches in the group stages and confirmed their place in the quarter-finals. They set a record of winning eight consecutive matches against foreign opposition, the most by any Indian team, bettering their own record of five wins, back in the Coca-Cola Cup. East Bengal also thus became the first Indian team to qualify for AFC Cup knockout stages, where they faced the eventual finalist Al-Jaish of Syria. In the first leg at home, East Bengal held the Syrian champions to a goalless draw, however, the Syrian team won 3–0 at home and East Bengal were eliminated from the tournament.

Group stage

Matches

2005 AFC Cup

East Bengal qualified for the 2005 AFC Cup after winning the 2003–04 National Football League and was placed in Group B alongside Al-Faisaly of Jordan, Nebitçi Balkanabat of Turkmenistan and Muktijoddha Sangsad of Bangladesh. In the opening game, at home, East Bengal drew goalless with Muktijoddha Sangsad of Bangladesh. East Bengal lost the next three matches to Nebitçi Balkanabat away and Al-Faisaly twice both home and away. They managed to win the last two matches, first a 1–0 win against Muktijoddha Sangsad away in Dhaka and then a 3–2 win at home against Nebitçi Balkanabat, courtesy of a hat-trick scored by Earnest Jeremiah. However, with two wins and one draw, East Bengal finished third in the group with seven points and was eliminated from the tournament.

Group stage

Matches

2008 AFC Cup

East Bengal FC qualified for the 2008 AFC Cup after winning the 2007 Federation Cup in Ludhiana and were placed in Group B alongside Safa SC of Lebanon, Al-Wahdat of Jordan and Al-Ahli San‘a’ of Yemen. The Red and Gold brigade lost the first match to Safa SC away at the Sports City Stadium, Beirut by a solitary goal but won back to back matches, first against Al-Ahli San‘a’ at the Salt Lake Stadium courtesy of a brilliant strike by Edmilson Marques Pardal and then against Al-Wahdat away at the Prince Mohammad Stadium, Zarqa by 2-0 with strikes from Alvito D'Cunha and Ikechukwu Gift Ibe, thus becoming the first Indian club to win at away against a West Asian team. East Bengal FC however, could not win any more matches in the group stage as they finished third with 2 wins and a draw and were eliminated on goal difference.

Group stage

2010 AFC Cup

East Bengal FC qualified for the 2010 AFC Cup after winning the 2009–10 Federation Cup in Guwahati. They were placed in Group D alongside Al-Ittihad of Syria, Al-Nejmeh of Lebanon and Al-Qadsia of Kuwait. East Bengal FC however, could not win any of the matches in the group stage as they finished last without any points and were eliminated.

Group stage

2011 AFC Cup

East Bengal qualified for the 2011 AFC Cup after winning the 2010 Federation Cup. They were placed in Group H alongside Chonburi of Thailand, Persipura Jayapura of Indonesia and South China of Hong Kong. In the opening match of the group, East Bengal faced Chonburi at home and in a thriller contest managed to secure a 4–4 draw after Tolgay Ozbey scored twice early to put East Bengal ahead only to concede four goals in succession and finally made a comeback with goals from Baljit Sahni and Ravinder Singh to equalise the match and share points. East Bengal lost the second match 4–1 to Persipura Jayapura away at Jakarta. Tolgay scored the only goal for the team. East Bengal lost again in the third match 1–0 against South China away at Hong Kong. In the fourth match, East Bengal managed a 3–3 draw against South China at the Barabati Stadium, courtesy of a last-minute equaliser from Tolgay to share points from the game. East Bengal lost 4–0 against Chonburi in the penultimate game of the group stage away at Chonburi. In the last match of the group stage, East Bengal drew 1–1 against Persipura Jayapura at home to end their campaign with three home draws and three away defeats as they finished at the bottom of the group with three points.

Group stage

2012 AFC Cup

East Bengal qualified for the 2012 AFC Cup after finishing runner-up of the 2010–11 I-League, as Salgaocar had won both the I-League and Federation Cup. This was their sixth and third successive qualification into the AFC Cup. East Bengal was placed in Group B alongside Al-Oruba of Yemen, Kazma of Kuwait and Arbil of Iraq. East Bengal suffered a disastrous campaign as they lost all six of their group stage matches against the strong West–Asian opponents and was thus eliminated from the tournament after finishing bottom of the group without any points.

Group stage

Matches

2013 AFC Cup

East Bengal qualified for the 2013 AFC Cup after winning the 2012 Federation Cup. This was their seventh appearance in the AFC Cup and fourth in succession since 2009–10. East Bengal was grouped with Selangor of Malaysia, Tampines Rovers of Singapore and Sai Gon Xuan Thanh of Vietnam in Group H. In the opening game, East Bengal defeated Selangor 1–0 at home courtesy of a solitary strike from Lalrindika Ralte in the first half. East Bengal played Sai Gon Xuan Thanh in the next match away in Ho Chi Minh City and drew 0–0. In the third match, East Bengal defeated Tampines Rovers 4–2 away from home with Australian forward Andrew Barisić scoring twice while Chidi Edeh scored one and the other came as an own-goal. East Bengal won against Rovers again in the next match at home by 2–1 with goals from Chidi Edeh and Lalrindika Ralte. East Bengal drew 2–2 against Selangor in the fifth match away in Shah Alam. Penn Orji and Lalrindika Ralte scored for the team. In the last match of the group stage, East Bengal defeated Sai Gon Xuan Thanh 4–1 with Penn Orji netting a brace, Chidi and Barisić netting one each. East Bengal topped the group with four wins and two draws without any defeats and confirmed a pre-quarterfinal fixture at home against Yangon United. On 15 May, East Bengal defeated Yangon United 5–1 at the Salt Lake Stadium with Chidi Edeh scoring a hattrick for the team while Penn Orji and Mehtab Hossain scored one each as East Bengal reached the quarter-finals. East Bengal coach Trevor Morgan resigned and Brazilian coach Marcos Falopa took charge. East Bengal was drawn against Semen Padang of Indonesia in the quarter-finals. In the first leg at home, on 17 September, East Bengal won 1–0 courtesy of a second-half goal from Japanese forward Ryuji Sueoka. In the return leg, on 24 September, East Bengal made history as they drew 1–1 against Semen Padang with James Moga equalising for the team in the second half and secured a place in the AFC Cup semi-final, the second Indian team to do so. East Bengal managed to remain undefeated in the tournament until the semi-finals, where they were drawn against the defending champions Al-Kuwait. On 1 October, East Bengal played the first leg in Kuwait City and lost 4–2. Uga Okpara and Lalrindika Ralte scored for the team. On 22 October, East Bengal faced Kuwait for the return leg at the Salt Lake Stadium in front of a record 50,000 crowd. However, East Bengal was defeated 3–0 by the eventual champions and thus ended their journey in the tournament.

Group stage

Matches

2015 AFC Cup

East Bengal qualified for the 2015 AFC Cup after finishing runner-up in the 2013–14 I-League. This was their eighth qualification into the AFC Cup. They were placed in Group F alongside Johor Darul Ta'zim of Malaysia, Kitchee of Hong Kong and Balestier Khalsa of Singapore. In the opening game, East Bengal lost 4–1 against Johor Darul Ta'zim away at Johor Bahru. Ranti Martins scored the only goal for the team. In the second game, East Bengal drew 1–1 against Kitchee, the champions of 2014–15 Hong Kong Premier League. Ranti Martins scored again for the team. In the third match, East Bengal lost 2–1 against Balestier Khalsa away in Singapore. East Bengal however, came back strong in the fourth match when they faced Balestier Khalsa again at home and won 3–0 with goals from Baldeep Singh, Ranti martins and an own-goal from Khalsa defender Nurullah Hussein. In the fifth match, East Bengal lost 1–0 at home to Johor Darul Ta'zim and in the last match of the group stage, East Bengal drew 2–2 against Kitchee away at Hong Kong with goals from Ranti Martins and Cavin Lobo as East Bengal finished third in the group with five points and were eliminated from the tournament.

Group stage

Matches

Other International Tournaments

1953 World Youth Congress, Bucharest

In 1953, after the Calcutta Football League was abandoned midway due to riots in Kolkata, East Bengal club received an invitation to participate in the World Youth Congress held in Bucharest, Romania. The East Bengal team was recommended as the official representative of India by then-president Dr Rajendra Prasad, as the best football club of India, as East Bengal had won the prestigious IFA Shield thrice in a row between 1949–51 and were the holders of the Durand Cup, winning it twice in 1951 and 1952. The East Bengal team led by captain Ahmed Khan and football secretary J.C. Guha, thus became the first Indian team to tour Europe. The club also roped in centre forward M. Thangaraj on loan from Wimco & State team for the tour. In the first match at the World Youth Congress, East Bengal faced Grazer of Austria and won 2–0. M. Thangaraj scored both the goals for East Bengal. In the second match, East Bengal defeated Lebanon XI 6–1. M. Thangaraj scored a hattrick, Ahmed Khan, Pansanttom Venkatesh and Masood Fakhri scored one each for East Bengal as they entered the semi-finals where they faced the hosts Romania. East Bengal lost 4–0 in the semi-final and met Germany in the third-place play-off match. They lost 5–2, with Fakhri and Thangaraj, scoring for the team as East Bengal finished fourth in the tournament.

Matches

1991 BTC Club Cup, Bangladesh

The BTC Club Cup was organised by the Bangladesh Football Federation in aid of cyclone and flood victims in Dhaka, Bangladesh. Six teams, three each from Bangladesh and India participated in the tournament: Brothers Union, Dhaka Mohammedan and Abahani Limited from Bangladesh, East Bengal, Mohun Bagan and Mohammedan Sporting from India. East Bengal was grouped alongside Brothers Union and Dhaka Mohammedan in Group A. In the opening match, East Bengal won 1–0 against Brothers Union with Bikash Panji scoring the solitary goal for the team. In the second match, East Bengal drew 1–1 against Dhaka Mohammedan. Imtiaz Ahmed Nakib scored for the home side while Prasanta Banerjee equalised for East Bengal as they progressed into the Semi-finals where they faced Abahani Limited. Sheikh Mohammad Aslam and Rizvi Karim Rumi scored the two goals for Abahani as East Bengal lost 2–1 and were eliminated from the tournament. Krishanu Dey scored a late consolation for East Bengal in the match.

Group stage

Bracket

Matches

1993 Wai Wai Cup, Nepal

East Bengal participated in the 1993 Wai Wai Cup held in Kathmandu, Nepal led by coach Shyamal Ghosh and captain Ilyas Pasha. East Bengal was grouped alongside RCT, Nepal Youth and Janakpur in the group stages. In the opening match on 5 June, East Bengal defeated RCT 3–0 to start their campaign. Sisir Ghosh scored a brace while Kiron Khongsai scored the third for East Bengal. In the second match, East Bengal drew 1–1 against the Nepal Youth team. Kiron Khongsai scored again for the team while Rajesh Nepali scored for Nepal Youth. In the third match, East Bengal drew again, this time 2–2 against Janakpur with Sisir Ghosh and Sanjay Majhi scoring for the team as they entered the knockout stage. In the semi-final, East Bengal faced Malaysian top division club Terengganu and won 1–0 with a solitary goal from Kiron Khongsai, who scored his third goal in the tournament. In the final, East Bengal faced RCT once again and won 1–0 courtesy of an own-goal by RCT defender Suman Enjon as East Bengal became champions of the tournament, their second title on foreign soil after 1985 Coca-Cola Cup.

Matches

1996 Coca-Cola International Cup, Nepal

East Bengal received an invitation and participated in the 1996 Coca-Cola International Cup held in Nepal as a part of their pre-season preparation for the 1996–97 National Football League. East Bengal was grouped alongside Sankata Boys and Tribhuvan Club in the group stages. In the first game, East Bengal lost 2–1 against Sankata Boys but came back strong in the next match against Tribhuvan Club to win 2–1 with Tausif Jamal and Latvian attacker Sergei Kutov scoring for the team and securing a place in the Semi-finals. In the Semi-final, however, East Bengal lost 2–0 against Manang Marshyangdi and was eliminated from the tournament.

Matches

1996–97 Bangabandhu Cup, Bangladesh

In 1996–97, before the start of the National Football League, East Bengal and Mohammedan Sporting from India were invited to participate in the inaugural Bangabandhu Cup held in Dhaka, Bangladesh. A total of twelve teams from different nations participated in the tournament which included hosts Dhaka Mohammedan, Abahani Krira Chakra, Muktijoddha Sangsad from Bangladesh, East Bengal and Mohammedan Sporting from India, Makassar from Indonesia, Bargh Shiraz from Iran, Malaysia Red and Malaysia Blue, Kosmos from Russia, Friends from Nepal and Eastern All-Star from Thailand. East Bengal was grouped alongside Dhaka Mohammedan and Friends Club from Nepal in group B. East Bengal lost both the matches in the group stage, 1–0 to Friends Club and 3–1 to hosts Dhaka Mohammedan and was eliminated from the tournament without a single point.

Matches

2003 ASEAN Club Championship, Indonesia
The ASEAN Club Championship is a friendly international football competition between domestic champion clubs sides run by the ASEAN Football Federation. Formerly known as the LG Cup, sponsored by LG Electronics. LG described the competition as a "social marketing experiment". Qualification to the competition was for champions clubs from AFF-affiliated countries only, plus the champions from India in 2003. After winning the 2002–03 National Football League, East Bengal was invited to the inaugural 2003 ASEAN Club Championship held at Jakarta, Indonesia. Top clubs from South-East Asia participated in the tournament which included the favourites BEC Tero Sasana from Thailand who already reached the 2002–03 AFC Champions League Finals. The star-studded team consisted of Golden Ball winner of 2002–03 AFC Champions League: Therdsak Chaiman. Other top teams like 2002 Malaysia Super League Champions Perak FC and Liga Indonesia 2002 Champions Petrokimia Putra participated in the tournament.

East Bengal was grouped alongside BEC Tero Sasana and Philippine Army in Group D. They lost the first match against the favourites BEC Tero Sasana 1–0, courtesy of a solitary goal from Therdsak Chaiman. The Red and Gold brigade bounced back in style as they defeated the Philippine Army 6–0, with Bhaichung Bhutia scoring all 6 goals, becoming the only Indian player to score a double hattrick in an International game to date. In the Quarter Finals, East Bengal faced Persita Tangerang of Indonesia. Goals from Bhaichung and Bijen Singh ensured a 2–1 win for the Kolkata side. Bhaichung was again on the scoresheet when East Bengal faced Petrokimia Putra in the Semi-Final. The score was 1–1 after 120 minutes and the Red and Golds won 7–6 in the shootout. On 26 July 2003, East Bengal made history as they defeated the favourites BEC Tero Sasana 3–1 with goals from Mike Okoro, Bhaichung and Alvito D'Cunha, hence becoming the first Indian club to win a top-level officially recognised tournament in foreign Soil. Bhaichung became the top scorer of the tournament with nine goals. Sandip Nandy was adjudged as the Best Goalkeeper of the Tournament.

Group stage

Matches

2004 Pepsi Max Challenge Cup, England

After winning National Football League titles in 2002–03 and 2003–04, East Bengal club tied up with a partnership with Premier League giants Leicester City in 2004. To commemorate the partnership, East Bengal Club was invited to participate in the 120th anniversary quadrangular tournament of Leicester City in England along with Real Mallorca of Spain and Marítimo of Portugal, known as the Pepsi Max Challenge Cup. On 31 July, East Bengal faced Leicester City at the Walkers Stadium, the home of Leicester, and lost 1–0 courtesy of a penalty goal in the sixty-ninth minute by Trevor Benjamin. East Bengal faced Portuguese Primeira Liga side Marítimo in the third-place play-off match the next day and lost 3–0. East Bengal lost both the matches in the tournament but the good-will tour ended on a high note as East Bengal club was felicitated at the House of Commons of the United Kingdom by the deputy Prime Minister John Prescott.

Bracket

Matches

2004 San Miguel International Cup, Nepal

After winning the 2004–05 Calcutta Football League title, East Bengal decided to participate in the invitational San Miguel International Cup held in Kathmandu, Nepal as a part of their pre-season preparation for the 2004–05 National League campaign. The tournament featured six teams which included East Bengal and Tollygunge Agragami from India, Farashganj from Bangladesh, Hannam University from South Korea and two teams from hosts Nepal namely Nepal Red and Nepal Blue. East Bengal was grouped with Nepal Red and Farashgunj in Group A. In the opening game on 25 December, East Bengal lost 1–0 to hosts Nepal Red team. Basanta Thapa scored the only goal in the 78th minute of the game. East Bengal came back strong in the second match as they defeated Farashgunj 2–1 to reach the semi-finals. Chandan Das and Alvito D'Cunha scored for the team. In the semi-final, East Bengal faced Nepal Blue on 31 December and won 1–0 courtesy of a solitary strike from Brazilian forward Paolo Roberto da Silva. In the final, East Bengal faced the South Korean Hannam University team and after 120 minutes, the score remained 0–0 and East Bengal won 4–2 via penalty shoot-out and lifted their fourth trophy on international soil.

Group stage

Bracket

Matches

2011 BTV Becamex IDC Cup, Vietnam

After winning the 2010 Federation Cup and becoming runner-up in the 2010–11 I-League, East Bengal club received an invitation to participate in the BTV Becamex IDC Cup in Vietnam and the club accepted the invitation to travel to Thu Dau Mot as a part of the pre-season campaign for the 2011–12 I-League. East Bengal was grouped alongside SHB Da Nang and Sai Gon Xuan Thanh from Vietnam and Matsubara from Brazil in group B. In the opening match, on 7 October, East Bengal drew 2–2 against SHB Da Nang. East Bengal took the lead twice through Khanthang Paite and Reisangmei Vashum but squandered the lead both times as the game ended in a draw. East Bengal suffered another blow as Tolgay Ozbey was shown a red card in the 89th minute of the game. In the second match, East Bengal lost 1–0 to Sai Gon Xuan Thanh as they conceded in the 89th minute. In the last game of the group stage, on 11 October, East Bengal lost once again to Matsubara by 1–0 and ended their campaign with just 1 point from three matches, without any victories.

Matches

2015 Sheikh Kamal International Club Cup, Bangladesh

After winning the 2015–16 Calcutta Football League, East Bengal, along with Mohammedan Sporting received an invitation to participate in the inaugural Sheikh Kamal International Club Cup to be held in Chittagong, Bangladesh. East Bengal accepted the invitation and travelled to Bangladesh as a part of their pre-season campaign for the 2015–16 I-League. East Bengal was grouped along with Chittagong Abahani, K-Electric and Dhaka Abahani in Group B. In the opening match, on 20 October, East Bengal defeated the hosts Chittagong Abahani 2–1. Mohammed Rafique and Prohlad Roy scored for East Bengal. In the second match, East Bengal won 3–1 against 2014–15 Pakistan Premier League champions K-Electric with Orok Essien, Mohammed Rafique and Ranti Martins scoring the team. In the last game of the group, East Bengal drew 0–0 with Dhaka Abahani to top the group and reach the semi-finals, where they faced Dhaka Mohammedan. On 28 October, East Bengal defeated Dhaka Mohammedan 3–0 to reach the final of the tournament. Ranti Martins scored twice while Mohammed Rafique scored the other. In the final, on 30 October, East Bengal once again faced the hosts Chittagong Abahani, whom they had defeated in the first game. East Bengal took the lead early after the ball deflected off Rezaul Karim into the net as an own goal from a powerful shot by Avinabo Bag in the eleventh minute. However, the hosts rallied from behind to score thrice, with Eleta Kingsley netting a brace and Hemanta Vincent Biswas scoring the third as East Bengal lost the final 3–1 and finished runner-up.

Group stage

Matches

East Bengal International Tours

East Bengal Tour of Burma, 1937

Pre-Independence, although they had toured Burma earlier back in 1932, however, then Burma used to be part of the British India, hence this can be traced back as the very first International tour East Bengal club made. Led by captain Dulal Banerjee in the absence of Paresh Majumdar, the East Bengal team along with their manager J. N. Mukherjee traveled to Rangoon in October 1937. At first, they were supposed to play 3 friendly exhibition matches, however, later, on the demands of the crowd, the East Bengal team played five matches in their maiden international tour. East Bengal won two, lost two, and drew the other among the five matches they played in the tour.

On 13 October 1937, East Bengal played their first game against the Burmese XI at the BAA Ground and suffered a heavy defeat by 6–0 to the home side. However, East Bengal came back strong in the second match on 15 October against Burmese XI (Reserves) and won by 2–1 with a brace from N. Majumdar. Fred Pugsley scored the only goal for the home team. In the third match on 18 October, East Bengal avenged their defeat from the first match against the Burmese Xi as they won 4–2. Right-out Samad opened the scoring for East Bengal and then Murgesh scored a brace. The Burmese XI had reduced the margin through a penalty just before halftime from a penalty kick by Wellin, but East Bengal scored once again after the break, through Left-inside forward Joseph to restore the three-goal lead. Ba Thaung scored a late consolation for the home team. East Bengal played two more exhibition games at the request of the Burmese crowd, out of which they lost 1–0 in one game and the other finished goalless as they concluded their tour and returned to Calcutta.

Matches

East Bengal Tour of USSR, 1953

After the great performance at the 1953 World Youth Festival in Bucharest, East Bengal was invited to play a series of games by the Soviet Union. The team travelled directly from Bucharest to Moscow on 19 August and on 21 August, they faced Torpedo Moscow at the Central Dynamo Stadium in Moscow in front of a fully packed stadium. Evgeniy Malov scored in the very first minute for the 1952 Soviet Cup champions and Nikolay Senyukov made it 2–0 in the tenth minute for the hosts. East Bengal team regained their confidence as M. Thangaraj pulled one back in the eighteenth minute and Pansanttom Venkatesh equalised with a brilliantly taken freekick in the twenty-eighth minute. The Torpedo team went ahead again just after the break in the forty-sixth minute courtesy of a goal from Valentin Ivanov but East Bengal managed to equalise once again as Venkatesh found the back of the net in the sixty-fifth minute and East Bengal managed to draw against the Soviet Cup champions 3–3, with half of the team playing barefooted. For the next match, East Bengal travelled to Tbilisi, where they faced the runner-up of the 1953 Soviet Top League, Dynamo Tbilisi. On 25 August, East Bengal played Dynamo Tbilisi at the Lenin Dinamo Stadium in front of a 40,000 packed crowd and suffered a 9–1 defeat. Zaur Kaloev scored four goals while Giorgi Antadze, Revaz Makharadze, Aleksandre Kotrikadze, Konstantin Gagnidze and Yuri Vardimiadi scored one each. M. Thangaraj scored the only goal for East Bengal in the twenty-fifth minute. East Bengal team travelled back to Moscow for their next game on 1 September against 1953 Soviet Cup champions Dynamo Moscow and lost 6–0. The legendary goalkeeper Lev Yashin played in the game against East Bengal. Sergei Korshunov and Konstantin Beskov scored twice, Vladimir Ilyin and Vladimir Ryzhkin scored one each for the Russian champions. The team travelled once again to Kyiv for their last match of the tour where they faced Dynamo Kyiv, the runner-up of the 1952 Soviet Top League. On 6 September, East Bengal played Dynamo Kyiv at the Republican Stadium in front of a 70,000 packed crowd and suffered a 13–1 defeat, the biggest defeat for the club to date. Mykhaylo Koman scored four goals for the Ukrainian giants, Andrei Zazroyev, Pavlo Vinkovatov and Aleksandr Ryzhikov scored a brace each while Mykhaylo Mykhalyna, Viktor Fomin and Volodymyr Bogdanovich scored one each. 20 year old Krishna Kittu scored the only goal for East Bengal in the second half. The East Bengal players could not cope up with the extreme climate of Soviet Russia and the fatigue of the tour took a toll on the players as they lost last three games before returning to India.

Matches

East Bengal Tour of Myanmar, 2009

In 2009, under coach Subhash Bhowmick, East Bengal toured Myanmar in August for a set of friendlies as a part of their pre-season campaign after a heavy training camp in Puri, Odisha. East Bengal travelled to Mandalay to face Yadanarbon on 16 August and suffered a 2–1 defeat in their opening game of the tour. Harmanjot Khabra scored the only goal for East Bengal. East Bengal however, won the next match 3–1 against Yangon United on 19 August in Yangon. Khabra scored once again while Edmilson scored a brace for East Bengal. On 21 August, East Bengal played their third match of the tour against Okktha United and won 1–0 courtesy of a solitary strike from newly signed Argentine forward Omar Sebastián Monesterolo. On 23 August, East Bengal played their last match of the tour against Magwe and held onto a 2–2 draw with Monesterolo and Beikhokhei Beingaichho scoring the team. East Bengal returned to India with two wins, a draw and defeat apiece from four matches in the tour.

Matches

East Bengal Tour of Malaysia, 2018

In 2018, under coach Alejandro Menendez, East Bengal toured to Malaysia in October for their pre-season campaign before the start of the 2018-19 I-League. In a span of 3 weeks, East Bengal trained at the MSN Sports Complex in Kuala Lumpur and played a set of four friendly matches against Malaysia Premier League and Malaysia Super League teams. On 7 October, East Bengal faced UiTM in Shah Alam and won 4–1. Yami Longvah, Enrique Esqueda, Mahmoud Amnah and Jobi Justin socred for East Bengal. East Bengal was supposed to face UKM on 10 October for their next match but due to heavy rainfall and poor ground conditions the match was cancelled. East Bengal faced Malaysian Super Division side Terengganu in their next match on 13 October in Nilai and the match ended 0–0. East Bengal played PDRM in their next match on 17 October and won 6–2. Enrique netted a brace, Surabuddin Mollick, Bidyashagar Singh and Jobby Justin scored one each while the other was an own goal. In their last match on 19 October, East Bengal played UiTM Reserves and won 1–0 courtesy of a goal from Enrique, who scored his fourth goal of the tour. East Bengal finished the tour with three wins and a draw from four matches, while one match was abandoned due to bad weather.

Matches

Bibliography
 Books

References

External links
AFC Champions League, the-AFC.com
AFC Cup, the-AFC.com
RSSSF – Asian Cup Winners Cup

East Bengal Club
Defunct Asian Football Confederation club competitions
Bangladesh
East Bengal